Alone in Love (lit. Love Generation) is a 2006 South Korean television series starring Kam Woo-sung, Son Ye-jin, Gong Hyung-jin and Lee Ha-na. It is based on the Japanese novel  by Hisashi Nozawa, which was published in 1996 and won the 4th Shimase Literary Prize for Romance in 1997, and tells the story of two ordinary people, as they come to terms with their relationship. The series aired on SBS from April 3 to May 23, 2006, on Mondays and Tuesdays at 21:55 (KST) for 16 episodes.

The series won critical acclaim for its subtle and realistic portrayal of love, marriage and divorce.

Synopsis
Yoo Eun-ho (Son Ye-jin) and Lee Dong-jin (Kam Woo-sung) meet one day at the bookstore where he works and they are immediately drawn to each other. They fall in love after subsequent meetings, and are eventually married. Two years later, they are divorced.

Dong-jin still works at the bookstore, while Eun-ho works at a fitness club. Even so, a year and a half after their divorce, the two still meet in their favorite bakery for breakfasts, quarrel over trivial things like a married couple, and eat dinner on their wedding anniversary with a free meal coupon provided by the hotel where they got married. The narrative is punctuated by either character's internal monologue on their past and current relationships, as new love interests enter their lives.

All of this makes them wonder whether these lingering feelings are love, although both are too afraid to start over, and even more afraid to end the relationship completely. With neither brave enough to confront each other about the misunderstanding on the day Eun-ho had a stillborn baby, they are unable to move on.

Cast

Production
The Korean adaptation was written by Park Yeon-seon (screenwriter for My Tutor Friend and Too Beautiful to Lie). This is the first TV series directed by film director Han Ji-seung (who won a Grand Bell award in 2001 for A Day).

Filming locations
Most of the filming locations were in Bundang-gu, Seongnam, Gyeonggi Province. Eun-ho and Ji-ho's house is in Bundang-dong near St. John's Cathedral. Dong-jin's house is the Ewha Villa. The Dunkin' Donuts branch that Dong-jin and Eun-ho frequent is in Jeongja-dong. The hospital where Jun-pyo works is Bundang Jesaeng Hospital near Seohyeon Station. Eun-ho's everyday bike route is along Tancheon Bicycle Road in Imae-dong.

The bookstore where Dong-jin works is the Kyobo Bookstore near Gangnam Station. The fitness club where Eun-ho works is the Suwon World Cup Sports Center, behind the Suwon World Cup Stadium. The beach where Dong-jin proposed to Eun-ho is in Jeongdongjin. The Grand Hyatt Seoul is where they have their faux anniversary dinner. Dong-jin's wedding to Yoo-kyung takes place on the Hanriver Land Ferry.

Soundtrack

Ratings
In this table,  represent the lowest ratings and  represent the highest ratings.

Source: TNS Media Korea

Awards and nominations

International broadcast
The series aired in Japan on Hallyu cable channel KNTV in April 2007. It also aired in the United States with English subtitles on MHz WorldView in January 2010.

In Thailand, the series aired on Channel 7 from September 13, 2008, to November 2, 2008, on Saturdays and Sundays from 09:15 to 11:00 (ICT).

References

External links
 Alone in Love official SBS website 
 
 

Bundang
Seoul Broadcasting System television dramas
2006 South Korean television series debuts
2006 South Korean television series endings
Korean-language television shows
South Korean melodrama television series
South Korean romance television series
Television shows based on Japanese novels